Cosmic Odyssey may refer to:

 Cosmic Odyssey (comics)
 Cosmic Odyssey (documentary)